Ben Schreckinger (born c. 1990) is an American journalist and writer. He is a national political correspondent for Politico Magazine, author, and "long-form writer." He is the author of The Bidens: Inside the First Family’s Fifty-Year Rise to Power— a book on the life of U.S. President Joe Biden.

Schreckinger is from Belmont, Massachusetts. He attended Brown University, where he studied classics and graduated with a Bachelor of Arts in 2012. As a student, he was Editor-in-Chief of The Brown Daily Herald. Later he freelanced as a ghostwriter for a consultancy's blog, for The Boston Globe, and for Boston Magazine. Politico was Schreckinger's first full-time job following his education at Brown University. He has also written for has also written for Salon, The Financial Times, The Atlantic, The Boston Globe and for GQ.

In March and June 2016, Schreckinger was denied entry to or ejected from then-candidate and future U.S. President Trump events he was covering at the time. In the latter case, Schreckinger had entered using a general admission ticket, not a press pass, so a security guard removed him. In the summer of 2019, Schreckinger reported on bias at the Southern Poverty Law Center. In November 2020, Schreckinger signed a contract with Twelve to write his The Bidens book; upon its 2021 publication, Bret Stephens characterized it in The New York Times as "scrupulously reported".  That same year, Brown Political Review reported Schreckinger was the first reporter by a "reputable news organization" to confirm some of the emails in the Hunter Biden laptop story. A Biden campaign spokesman described one of Schreckinger's articles about a property transaction conducted by one of Biden's brothers as "an absolute joke."

Books

Awards
2011 outstanding reporting award by The Fund for American Studies.

2021 National Headliner Award for best magazine column.

References

Living people
Brown University alumni
Year of birth missing (living people)